Platinum disulfide is the inorganic compound with the formula PtS2. It is a black, semiconducting solid, which is insoluble in all solvents.  The compound adopts the cadmium iodide structure, being composed of sheets of octahedral Pt and pyramidal sulfide centers.  Single crystals are grown by chemical vapor transport using phosphorus as the transport agent.  A related compound is platinum(II) sulfide, PtS.

References 

Sulfides
Sulfides,2
Transition metal dichalcogenides